The Río de Oro is a river of Chaco Province, Argentina. It is a tributary of the Paraguay River, which is debouches into near Humaitá, Paraguay.

See also
List of rivers of Argentina

References

 Rand McNally, The New International Atlas, 1993.

External links
 

Rivers of Chaco Province
Rivers of Argentina
Tributaries of the Paraguay River